Conus mappa is a species of sea snail, a marine gastropod mollusk in the family Conidae, the cone snails and their allies.

There are two recognized subspecies:
 Conus mappa jesusramirezi (Cossignani, 2010)
 Conus mappa trinitarius Hwass in Bruguière, 1792.
 Conus mappa granarius Kiener, 1845.: synonym of Conus granarius

The junior homonym Conus mappa Crosse, 1858 is a synonym of Conus eldredi Morrison, 1955.

Like all species within the genus Conus, these snails are predatory and venomous. They are capable of "stinging" humans, therefore live ones should be handled carefully or not at all.

Description
The size of the wide shell varies between 36 mm and 67 mm. The spire contains small nodules and has a smooth shoulder. The body whorl is smooth and has a very variable color pattern of milkish white to pinkish white with two spiral bands of greenish yellow to darker brown. These bands are broken into irregular patches. The spiral whorls show very fine longitudinal grooves. The aperture is whitish.

Distribution
This species occurs in the Caribbean Sea off Venezuela, Trinidad - and Barbados where it occurs only at 85 fathoms/155 metres depth

References

 Holeman J; and Kohn A.J. (1970), The identity of Conus mappa (Lightfoot), C. insularis  Gmelin, C. aurantius Hwass in Bruguière and Hwass's infraspecific taxa of C. cedonulii; Journal of Conchology 27 135:137
 Tucker J.K. & Tenorio M.J. (2013) Illustrated catalog of the living cone shells. 517 pp. Wellington, Florida: MdM Publishing. 
 Puillandre N., Duda T.F., Meyer C., Olivera B.M. & Bouchet P. (2015). One, four or 100 genera? A new classification of the cone snails. Journal of Molluscan Studies. 81: 1–23

Gallery

External links
 The Conus Biodiversity website
 
 
 Cone Shells – Knights of the Sea

mappa
Gastropods described in 1786